Thomas J. Springer is a former member of the Wisconsin State Assembly. Springer was born on April 25, 1968, in Mosinee, Wisconsin. He would graduate from the University of Wisconsin-Madison. Springer was first elected to the Assembly in a special election in 1991. He is a Democrat.

References

People from Mosinee, Wisconsin
Democratic Party members of the Wisconsin State Assembly
University of Wisconsin–Madison alumni
1968 births
Living people